The 2009 British GP2 round was the fourth round of the 2009 GP2 Series season. It was held on 20 and 21 June 2009 at Silverstone Circuit at Silverstone, United Kingdom. The race was used as a support race to the 2009 British Grand Prix.

Past Winners include 2008 champion Giorgio Pantano and runner up, Bruno Senna, who both did not compete this year. 2008 Formula One World Champion Lewis Hamilton also won in 2006.

Romain Grosjean started from Pole in the feature race, with Alberto Valerio taking a surprise second in his Piquet GP car. Both drivers got off the line well, but within five laps Valerio passed Grosjean for the lead. Grosjean continued to fall back and finished in fifth place.

Pastor Maldonado of ART Grand Prix won the sprint race from the front row, he beat Andreas Zuber off the line, and the two of them did not change their positions at the chequered flag, after a late safety car period.

Standings after the round 

Drivers' Championship standings

Teams' Championship standings

 Note: Only the top five positions are included for both sets of standings.

External links
 https://web.archive.org/web/20071212165547/http://www.silverstone.co.uk/php/rm_britishGP.html
 http://www.gp2series.com/en//website/2009gp2series/results/season/
 http://www.gp2series.com/en//website/2009gp2series/results/season/
 http://www.gp2series.com/en//website/2009gp2series/news/newsgp2/newsdetail.php?articleid=2414
 http://www.gp2series.com/en//website/2009gp2series/news/newsgp2/newsdetail.php?articleid=2418

Silverstone
Silverstone